Black duck may refer to three dabbling ducks:
 African black duck, Anas sparsa
 American black duck, Anas rubripes
 Pacific black duck, Anas superciliosa

Black Duck or Blackduck may also refer to:

Places

Canada 
 Black Duck, Newfoundland and Labrador, a settlement in Canada
 Black Duck Creek (Manitoba), a stream in the Northern Region of Manitoba
 Black Duck Creek (Ontario), a stream in Osborne Township in Northeastern Ontario

United States 
 Blackduck, Minnesota, a small city in the United States
 Blackduck Lake, a lake in Minnesota
 Blackduck River, tributary of Red Lake in northwestern Minnesota
 Blackduck State Forest, a state forest in Minnesota

Other places 
 Black Duck Creek, Queensland, a locality in the Lockyer Valley Region, Queensland, Australia

Organizations 
 Black Duck (group), an Italian pop music group
 Black Duck Software, a software auditing company
 Black Duck Joint Venture, a conservation partnership
 Black Ducks, a nickname sometimes used for the Swan Districts Football Club

See also 
 Black sea duck